John Gillies  is an Australian visual artist, filmmaker and musician, particularly known for his "multi-layered and complex" video works and installations. He has also curated a number of video art programs.

Gillies studied visual art and music at the University of Southern Queensland, including film and video with David Perry. Later he studied at Sydney College of the Arts.

He has produced many video art works since the 1980s including Hymn (1983), Techno/Dumb/Show (1991), Armada (1994–98), My Sister's Room (2000) and Divide (2006). and is particularly known for his collaborations with  performers including The Sydney Front (Techno/Dumb/Show and Test), Clare Grant (The Mary Stuart Tapes) and Tess de Quincey (The de Quincey Tapes and Shiver Remix).  Based partially on the writings of the early twentieth century Polish avant-garde writer and artist Witkacy and his argument in Australia with anthropologist Bronisław Malinowski, Gillies created the film and art installation, Witkacy & Malinowski: a cinematic séance in 23 scenes.

Gillies has recorded and performed as a solo musician (often with video projection), and was drummer and percussionist with experimental musician Jon Rose, keyboardist Jamie Fielding and Indigenous singer-songwriter Kev Carmody. The subsequent Carmody releases Street Beat and the album Bloodlines, which included the song From Little Things Big Things Grow, were nominated for ARIA awards in 1993 and 1994. He has had a long collaboration with guitarist Michael Sheridan, including playing in Sydney post-punk jazz band Great White Noise, Slaughterhouse (aka Slawterhaus) and with singer Radical Son.

Collections 
  Art Gallery of New South Wales, Sydney
  , Hiroshima
 Australian Centre for the Moving Image, Melbourne
 Museum of Contemporary Art Australia, Sydney
 Queensland Art Gallery, Brisbane 
 National Gallery of Australia, Canberra

References

External links

Scanlines: Media Art in Australia since the 1960s
John Gillies: Videowork,22 April–27 May 2006, Institute of Modern Art, Brisbane

1960 births
Living people
Australian male musicians
University of Southern Queensland alumni
Musicians from Queensland
Australian video artists